In politics and government, a spoils system (also known as a patronage system) is a practice in which a political party, after winning an election, gives government jobs to its supporters, friends (cronyism), and relatives (nepotism) as a reward for working toward victory, and as an incentive to keep working for the party—as opposed to a merit system, where offices are awarded on the basis of some measure of merit, independent of political activity.

The term was used particularly in politics of the United States, where the federal government operated on a spoils system until the Pendleton Act was passed in 1883 due to a civil service reform movement. Thereafter the spoils system was largely replaced by nonpartisan merit at the federal level of the United States.

The term was derived from the phrase "to the victor belong the spoils" by New York Senator William L. Marcy, referring to the victory of Andrew Jackson in the election of 1828, with the term spoils meaning goods or benefits taken from the loser in a competition, election or military victory.

Similar spoils systems are common in other nations that traditionally have been based on tribal organization or other kinship groups and localism in general.

Origins
Although it is commonly thought that the spoils system was introduced by President Andrew Jackson, historical evidence does not support this view. Patronage came to the United States during its Colonial history, whereas in its modern form, the spoils system got introduced into U.S. politics during the administration of George Washington, whose outlook generally favored members of the Federalist Party. Sometimes, Washington is accused of introducing the system himself. In addition, both John Adams and Thomas Jefferson have also been accused, to a degree, of introducing the spoils system to U.S. politics.

In 1828, moderation was expected to prevail in the transfer of political power from one U.S. president to another. This had less to do with the ethics of politicians than it did with the fact the presidency had not transferred from one party to another since the election of 1800—known historically for the extraordinary steps the outgoing Federalist Party took to try and maintain as much influence as possible by exploiting their control over federal appointments up until their final hours in office (see: Marbury v. Madison and Midnight Judges Act). By 1816, the Federalists were no longer nationally viable, and the U.S. became effectively a one-party polity under the Democratic-Republican Party. The Jacksonian split after the 1824 election restored the two-party system. 
Jackson's first inauguration, on March 4, 1829, marked the first time since 1801 where one party yielded the presidency to another. A group of office seekers attended the event, explaining it as democratic enthusiasm. Jackson supporters had been lavished with promises of positions in return for political support. These promises were honored by a large number of removals after Jackson assumed power. At the beginning of Jackson's administration, fully 919 officials were removed from government positions, amounting to nearly 10 percent of all government postings.

The Jackson administration aimed at creating a more efficient system where the chain of command of public employees all obeyed the higher entities of government. The most-changed organization within the federal government proved to be the Post Office. The Post Office was the largest department in the federal government, and had even more personnel than the War Department. In one year, 423 postmasters were deprived of their positions, most with extensive records of good service. Nevertheless, Jackson did not differ much from other Presidents in the number of officials he replaced by his own partisans.

Reform
By the late 1860s, citizens began demanding civil service reform, but it was only after the assassination of James A. Garfield by a rejected office-seeker in 1881 that the calls for civil service reform intensified. Moderation of the spoils system at the federal level with the passage of the Pendleton Act in 1883, which created a bipartisan Civil Service Commission to evaluate job candidates on a nonpartisan merit basis. While few jobs were covered under the law initially, the law allowed the President to transfer jobs and their current holders into the system, thus giving the holder a permanent job.  The Pendleton Act's reach was expanded as the two main political parties alternated control of the White House every election between 1884 and 1896. Following each election, the outgoing President applied the Pendleton Act to some of the positions for which he had appointed political supporters. By 1900, most federal jobs were handled through civil service, and the spoils system was limited to fewer and fewer positions.

Although state patronage systems and numerous federal positions were unaffected by the law, Karabell argues that the Pendleton Act was instrumental in the creation of a professional civil service and the rise of the modern bureaucratic state. The law also caused major changes in campaign finance, as the parties were forced to look for new sources of campaign funds, such as wealthy donors.

The separation between political activity and the civil service was made stronger with the Hatch Act of 1939 which prohibited federal employees from engaging in many political activities.

The spoils system survived much longer in many states, counties and municipalities, such as the Tammany Hall machine, which survived until the 1950s when New York City reformed its own civil service. Illinois modernized its bureaucracy in 1917 under Frank Lowden, but Chicago held on to patronage in city government until the city agreed to end the practice in the Shakman Decrees of 1972 and 1983.

See also
 Cronyism
 Political patronage
 Political corruption
 Separation of powers
 Soft despotism
 Whig Party (United States)

References

Sources
 
 
 
 
 Griffith, Ernest S. The Modern Development of the City in the United Kingdom and the United States (1927)
 Hoogenboom, Ari Arthur. Outlawing the Spoils: A history of the civil service reform movement, 1865–1883 (1961)
 

 Ostrogorski, M. Democracy and the Party System in the United States (1910)
  Rubio, Philip F. A History of Affirmative Action, 1619–2000 University Press of Mississippi (2001)
  Van Riper, Paul. History of the United States Civil Service Greenwood Press (1976; reprint of 1958 edition)

External links

 
 
 

Political terminology
Ethically disputed political practices
Andrew Jackson